Washington Township is one of the thirteen townships of Henry County, Ohio, United States. As of the 2010 census the population was 1,912, of whom 1,794 lived in the unincorporated portion of the township.

Geography
Located in the northeastern corner of the county, it borders the following townships:
Swan Creek Township, Fulton County - north
Providence Township, Lucas County - east
Grand Rapids Township, Wood County - southeast corner
Damascus Township - south
Harrison Township - southwest corner
Liberty Township - west
York Township, Fulton County - northwest corner

A small portion of the village of Liberty Center is located in western Washington Township, and the unincorporated community of Colton lies in the township's northwest.

Name and history
It is one of forty-three Washington Townships statewide.

Government
The township is governed by a three-member board of trustees, who are elected in November of odd-numbered years to a four-year term beginning on the following January 1. Two are elected in the year after the presidential election and one is elected in the year before it. There is also an elected township fiscal officer, who serves a four-year term beginning on April 1 of the year after the election, which is held in November of the year before the presidential election. Vacancies in the fiscal officership or on the board of trustees are filled by the remaining trustees.

References

External links
County website

Townships in Henry County, Ohio
Townships in Ohio